An olicula is a short hooded cape that could be worn by women over a stola for warmth.

References

Roman-era clothing